Phyllonorycter stigmaphyllae is a moth of the family Gracillariidae. It is known from Cuba.

The larvae feed on Stigmaphyllon sagraeanum. They mine the leaves of their host plant. The mine has the form of a large, irregular blotch-mine on the upperside of the leaf, leaving the very thin upper epidermis semitransparent whitish, while the underside of the leaf shows no sign of the mine.

References

stigmaphyllae
Moths of North America
Endemic fauna of Cuba
Moths described in 1934